Tuburan, officially the Municipality of Tuburan (Tausūg: Lupah Tuburan; Chavacano: Municipalidad de Tuburan), is a 2nd class municipality in the province of Basilan, Philippines. According to the 2020 census, it has a population of 24,742 people.

In 2006, the municipalities of Akbar and Hadji Mohammad Ajul were created from Tuburan, reducing its number of barangays from 30 to 10.

Geography

Barangays
Tuburan is politically subdivided into 10 barangays.

Climate

Demographics

In the 2020 census, Tuburan had a population of 24,742.

Economy

References

External links
  Tuburan Profile at the DTI Cities and Municipalities Competitive Index
[ Philippine Standard Geographic Code]

Municipalities of Basilan